Rakowice may refer to:

Rakowice, Bolesławiec County in Lower Silesian Voivodeship (south-west Poland)
Rakowice, Strzelin County in Lower Silesian Voivodeship (south-west Poland)
Rakowice, Ząbkowice Śląskie County in Lower Silesian Voivodeship (south-west Poland)
Rakowice, Łódź Voivodeship (central Poland)
Rakowice, Pomeranian Voivodeship (north Poland)
Rakowice, Warmian-Masurian Voivodeship (north Poland)
Rakowice, Kraków, part of the Prądnik Czerwony district of Kraków
Rakowice Małe
Rakowice Wielkie

See also
Kraków-Rakowice-Czyżyny Airport
Rakowski